Ludumo Galada (20 December 1982 – 11 January 2009) was a South African professional boxer who competed from 2005 to 2009. As an amateur, he competed at the 2002 Commonwealth Games, the 2003 World Championships and the 2004 Summer Olympics. He also won a bronze medal at the 2001 African Championships.

Career
Nicknamed "Pretty Boy", Galada was born in Mdantsane Township outside of East London in the Eastern Cape province. He began boxing at the age of ten out of curiosity and won his first medal the following year.

Galada represented South Africa at the 2002 Commonwealth Games where he fought as a bantamweight. Galada advanced to the quarterfinals where he lost to Ezekiel Letuka of Lesotho. He qualified for the 2004 Summer Olympics, where he fought as a featherweight. He lost in the 3rd round of his only match to Azerbaijan's Shahin Imranov. His final amateur record was 151–7–1 (102 KO).

After turning pro in 2005, he won the South African title in 2007 and successfully defended it 3 times. In early morning of 11 January 2009, while returning home visiting his sick brother in Johannesburg, Galada was killed in a car crash in Aliwal North in the Eastern Cape.

Professional boxing record

References

1982 births
2009 deaths
South African male boxers
Xhosa people
Bantamweight boxers
Featherweight boxers
Boxers at the 2002 Commonwealth Games
Commonwealth Games competitors for South Africa
Boxers at the 2004 Summer Olympics
Olympic boxers of South Africa
Road incident deaths in South Africa
People from Mdantsane
Sportspeople from the Eastern Cape